Newnam is a surname occurring from medieval times in Britain. The surname has many variations, such as "Newenham" and "Newnham".

People bearing it include:
 Thomas Newnam (died 1775), British explorer of Pen Park Hole
 Pat Newnam (1880–1938), American baseball player
 Frank Newnam, Jr. (fl. 1946-69), American third partner in Lockwood, Andrews & Newnam civil-engineering partnership & president of ASCE
 Boyd Newnam (fl. 1967-1971), American running trainer of Earl Owens
 Brendan Francis Newnam (born c. 1976), American radio host 
 Scott Newnam (fl. since 2000), American audio marketer
 Sarah Newnam (fl. 2009), Dartmouth ice hockey co-Captain, 2008–09
 Charles Newnam (born 1987), Naval Aviator
 Ben Newnam (born 1991), American soccer player

See also 
 Newnham (surname)
 Newnan, Georgia
  Newnham Paddox

References